An atomic battery, nuclear battery, radioisotope battery or radioisotope generator is a device which uses energy from the decay of a radioactive isotope to generate electricity.  Like nuclear reactors, they generate electricity from nuclear energy, but differ in that they do not use a chain reaction. Although commonly called batteries, they are technically not electrochemical and cannot be charged or recharged. They are very costly, but have an extremely long life and high energy density, and so they are typically used as power sources for equipment that must operate unattended for long periods of time, such as spacecraft, pacemakers, underwater systems and automated scientific stations in remote parts of the world.

Nuclear battery technology began in 1913, when Henry Moseley first demonstrated a current generated by charged particle radiation. The field received considerable in-depth research attention for applications requiring long-life power sources for space needs during the 1950s and 1960s. In 1954 RCA researched a small atomic battery for small radio receivers and hearing aids. Since RCA's initial research and development in the early 1950s, many types and methods have been designed to extract electrical energy from nuclear sources. The scientific principles are well known, but modern nano-scale technology and new wide-bandgap semiconductors have created new devices and interesting material properties not previously available.

Nuclear batteries can be classified by energy conversion technology into two main groups: thermal converters and non-thermal converters. The thermal types convert some of the heat generated by the nuclear decay into electricity. The most notable example is the radioisotope thermoelectric generator (RTG), often used in spacecraft. The non-thermal converters extract energy directly from the emitted radiation, before it is degraded into heat. They are easier to miniaturize and do not require a thermal gradient to operate, so they are suitable for use in small-scale applications. The most notable example is the betavoltaic cell.

Atomic batteries usually have an efficiency of 0.1–5%. High-efficiency betavoltaic devices can reach 6–8% efficiency.

Thermal conversion

Thermionic conversion 
A thermionic converter consists of a hot electrode, which thermionically emits electrons over a space-charge barrier to a cooler electrode, producing a useful power output. Caesium vapor is used to optimize the electrode work functions and provide an ion supply (by surface ionization) to neutralize the electron space charge.

Thermoelectric conversion 

A radioisotope thermoelectric generator (RTG) uses thermocouples. Each thermocouple is formed from two wires of different metals (or other materials).  A temperature gradient along the length of each wire produces a voltage gradient from one end of the wire to the other; but the different materials produce different voltages per degree of temperature difference.  By connecting the wires at one end, heating that end but cooling the other end, a usable, but small (millivolts), voltage is generated between the unconnected wire ends.  In practice, many are connected in series (or in parallel) to generate a larger voltage (or current) from the same heat source, as heat flows from the hot ends to the cold ends. Metal thermocouples have low thermal-to-electrical efficiency. However, the carrier density and charge can be adjusted in semiconductor materials such as bismuth telluride and silicon germanium to achieve much higher conversion efficiencies.

Thermophotovoltaic conversion 
Thermophotovoltaic (TPV) cells work by the same principles as a photovoltaic cell, except that they convert infrared light (rather than visible light) emitted by a hot surface, into electricity. Thermophotovoltaic cells have an efficiency slightly higher than thermoelectric couples and can be overlaid on thermoelectric couples, potentially doubling efficiency. The University of Houston TPV Radioisotope Power Conversion Technology development effort is aiming at combining thermophotovoltaic cells concurrently with thermocouples to provide a 3- to 4-fold improvement in system efficiency over current thermoelectric radioisotope generators.

Stirling generators 

A Stirling radioisotope generator is a Stirling engine driven by the temperature difference produced by a radioisotope. A more efficient version, the advanced Stirling radioisotope generator, was under development by NASA, but was cancelled in 2013 due to large-scale cost overruns.

Non-thermal conversion 
Non-thermal converters extract energy from emitted radiation before it is degraded into heat. Unlike thermoelectric and thermionic converters their output does not depend on the temperature difference. Non-thermal generators can be classified by the type of particle used and by the mechanism by which their energy is converted.

Electrostatic conversion 
Energy can be extracted from emitted charged particles when their charge builds up in a conductor, thus creating an electrostatic potential. Without a dissipation mode the voltage can increase up to the energy of the radiated particles, which may range from several kilovolts (for beta radiation) up to megavolts (alpha radiation). The built up electrostatic energy can be turned into usable electricity in one of the following ways.

Direct-charging generator 
A direct-charging generator consists of a capacitor charged by the current of charged particles from a radioactive layer deposited on one of the electrodes. Spacing can be either vacuum or dielectric. Negatively charged beta particles or positively charged alpha particles, positrons or fission fragments may be utilized. Although this form of nuclear-electric generator dates back to 1913, few applications have been found in the past for the extremely low currents and inconveniently high voltages provided by direct-charging generators. Oscillator/transformer systems are employed to reduce the voltages, then rectifiers are used to transform the AC power back to direct current.

English physicist H. G. J. Moseley constructed the first of these. Moseley's apparatus consisted of a glass globe silvered on the inside with a radium emitter mounted on the tip of a wire at the center. The charged particles from the radium created a flow of electricity as they moved quickly from the radium to the inside surface of the sphere. As late as 1945 the Moseley model guided other efforts to build experimental batteries generating electricity from the emissions of radioactive elements.

Electromechanical conversion 

Electromechanical atomic batteries use the buildup of charge between two plates to pull one bendable plate towards the other, until the two plates touch, discharge, equalizing the electrostatic buildup, and spring back. The mechanical motion produced can be used to produce electricity through flexing of a piezoelectric material or through a linear generator. Milliwatts of power are produced in pulses depending on the charge rate, in some cases multiple times per second (35 Hz).

Radiovoltaic conversion 
A radiovoltaic (RV) device converts the energy of ionizing radiation directly into electricity using a semiconductor junction, similar to the conversion of photons into electricity in a photovoltaic cell. Depending on the type of radiation targeted, these devices are called alphavoltaic (AV, αV), betavoltaic (BV, βV) and/or gammavoltaic (GV, γV). Betavoltaics have traditionally received the most attention since (low-energy) beta emitters cause the least amount of radiative damage, thus allowing a longer operating life and less shielding. Interest in alphavoltaic and (more recently) gammavoltaic devices is driven by their potential higher efficiency.

Alphavoltaic conversion 
Alphavoltaic devices use a semiconductor junction to produce electrical energy from energetic alpha particles.

Betavoltaic conversion 

Betavoltaic devices use a semiconductor junction to produce electrical energy from energetic beta particles (electrons). A commonly used source is the hydrogen isotope tritium.

Betavoltaic devices are particularly well-suited to low-power electrical applications where long life of the energy source is needed, such as implantable medical devices or military and space applications.

Gammavoltaic conversion 
Gammavoltaic devices use a semiconductor junction to produce electrical energy from energetic gamma particles (high-energy photons). They have only been considered in the 2010s but were proposed as early as 1981.

A gammavoltaic effect has been reported in perovskite solar cells. Another patented design involves scattering of the gamma particle until its energy has decreased enough to be absorbed in a conventional photovoltaic cell. Gammavoltaic designs using diamond and Schottky diodes are also being investigated.

Radiophotovoltaic (optoelectric) conversion 

In a radiophotovoltaic (RPV) device the energy conversion is indirect: the emitted particles are first converted into light using a radioluminescent material (a scintillator or phosphor), and the light is then converted into electricity using a photovoltaic cell. Depending on the type of particle targeted, the conversion type can be more precisely specified as alphaphotovoltaic (APV or α-PV), betaphotovoltaic (BPV or β-PV) or gammaphotovoltaic (GPV or γ-PV).

Radiophotovoltaic conversion can be combined with radiovoltaic conversion to increase the conversion efficiency.

Pacemakers 

Medtronic and Alcatel developed a plutonium-powered pacemaker, the Numec NU-5, powered by a 2.5 Ci slug of plutonium 238, first implanted in a human patient in 1970. The 139 Numec NU-5 nuclear pacemakers implanted in the 1970s are expected to never need replacing, an advantage over non-nuclear pacemakers, which require surgical replacement of their batteries every 5 to 10 years. The plutonium "batteries" are expected to produce enough power to drive the circuit for longer than the 88-year halflife of the plutonium.

Radioisotopes used 
Atomic batteries use radioisotopes that produce low energy beta particles or sometimes alpha particles of varying energies. Low energy beta particles are needed to prevent the production of high energy penetrating Bremsstrahlung radiation that would require heavy shielding. Radioisotopes such as tritium, nickel-63, promethium-147, and technetium-99 have been tested. Plutonium-238, curium-242, curium-244 and strontium-90 have been used. Besides the nuclear properties of the used isotope, there are also the issues of chemical properties and availability. A product deliberately produced via neutron irradiation or in a particle accelerator is more difficult to obtain than a fission product easily extracted from spent nuclear fuel.

Plutonium-238 must be deliberately produced via neutron irradiation of Neptunium-237 but it can be easily converted into a stable plutonium oxide ceramic. Strontium-90 is easily extracted from spent nuclear fuel but must be converted into the perovskite form strontium titanate to reduce its chemical mobility, cutting power density in half. Caesium-137, another high yield nuclear fission product, is rarely used in atomic batteries because it is difficult to convert into chemically inert substances. Another undesirable property of Cs-137 extracted from spent nuclear fuel is that it is contaminated with other isotopes of Caesium which reduce power density further.

Micro-batteries

In the field of microelectromechanical systems (MEMS), nuclear engineers at the University of Wisconsin, Madison have explored the possibilities of producing minuscule batteries which exploit radioactive nuclei of substances such as polonium or curium to produce electric energy. As an example of an integrated, self-powered application, the researchers have created an oscillating cantilever beam that is capable of consistent, periodic oscillations over very long time periods without the need for refueling. Ongoing work demonstrate that this cantilever is capable of radio frequency transmission, allowing MEMS devices to communicate with one another wirelessly.

These micro-batteries are very light and deliver enough energy to function as power supply for use in MEMS devices and further for supply for nanodevices.

The radiation energy released is transformed into electric energy, which is restricted to the area of the device that contains the processor and the micro-battery that supplies it with energy.

See also 
List of battery types
Button cell
Induced gamma emission from long-lived excited nuclei of specific nuclear isomers.
Radioisotope heater unit
Radioisotope rocket and nuclear electric rocket

References

External links 
Betavoltaic Historical Review
Cantilever Electromechanical Atomic Battery
Types of Radioisotopic Batteries
Americium Battery Concept Proposed for Space Applications- TFOT article
Nuclear Batteries (25 MW)
Tiny 'nuclear batteries' unveiled, BBC article about the research of Jae Wan Kwon et al. from the University of Missouri.

Battery types
Electrical generators
Nuclear technology
Nuclear power in space